Bidean nam Bian ('peak of the mountains') is the highest peak in a group of mountains south of Glen Coe and north of Glen Etive in the Scottish Highlands. It is a complex mountain, with many ridges and subsidiary peaks, one of which, Stob Coire Sgreamhach, is classified as a separate Munro.

Landscape
The most noticeable features of the Bidean nam Bian massif are the famous Three Sisters of Glen Coe, three  steeply-sided ridges that extend north into the Glen. Two of the sisters, Gearr Aonach ('short ridge') and Aonach Dubh ('black ridge') converge at Stob Coire nan Lochan, a  subsidiary peak of Bidean nam Bian that lies about 1 km to the northeast of the actual summit. The final, most easterly sister, Beinn Fhada ('long mountain'), joins the Bidean nam Bian massif at the summit of Stob Coire Sgreamhach.

Beinn Fhada is separated from Gearr Aonach by a glen known as Coire Gabhail ('glen of the capture'), often known as the 'Hidden' or 'Lost Valley', as it has a wide flat area concealed from Glen Coe by the landslip which blocked the entrance and allowed a loch to form. The glen was used by Clan Macdonald to hide their livestock from raiders, or hide cattle they themselves had stolen.

Ascent routes
There are several routes up onto Bidean nam Bian. One may continue from Coire Gabhail (the hidden valley), reaching the main ridge by means of a zig-zag path that climbs up the flank of Gearr Aonach to cliffs at the head of the corrie, and a patch of  scree at the bealach up to the ridge. From here, turn left to climb Stob Coire Sgreamhach which lies only about 0.5 km to the southeast, or right up along the cliff edge towards the summit of Bidean.

Other routes include ascending Stob Coire nan Lochan and then using the connecting ridge to reach the main summit, or ascending via the Allt Coire nam Beitheach and following either branch of this burn to reach the main ridge either side of the subsidiary peak of Stob Coire nam Beith, which lies about a kilometre to the west of the main summit.

All of the above routes start from Glen Coe and go through the corries running between the Three Sisters, and may thus be combined to allow a traverse of the mountain. Due to the accessibility of Bidean from the north, routes on the southern side are used much less frequently.

Avalanche
On 19 January 2013 four people were killed in an avalanche close to Church Door Buttress on the north side of Bidean nam Bian. A fifth person was airlifted to hospital with serious injuries and a sixth escaped unharmed. It was the worst avalanche in Scottish history and the worst in the UK since the Lewes avalanche in 1836.

Gallery

See also 

 Ben Nevis
 Mountains and hills of Scotland

External links
 Computer-generated virtual panoramas North South Index

References

Munros
Marilyns of Scotland
Mountains and hills of the Central Highlands
Highest points of historic Scottish counties
Mountains and hills of Highland (council area)
One-thousanders of Scotland
Glen Coe